Sandrine Mendiburu (born 15 October 1972) is a retired French professional golfer.

In 1999 Mendiburu recorded back-to-back wins on the Ladies European Tour, winning the Donegal Irish Ladies' Open in a four-way a playoff and Ladies Hannover Expo 2000 Open, which she followed up with a runner-up position at Air France Madame Open two weeks later. She ended the season fifth on the LET Order of Merit.

Amateur wins
1990 U.S. Girls' Junior

Professional wins (4)

Ladies European Tour wins (3)

Ladies European Tour playoff record (1–0)

Ladies Asian Golf Tour wins (1)

Team appearances
Amateur
European Ladies' Team Championship (representing France): 1989 (winners)
Espirito Santo Trophy (representing France): 1990

Professional
Praia d'El Rey European Cup (representing Ladies European Tour): 1999 (winners)

References

External links

French female golfers
Ladies European Tour golfers
Sportspeople from Pyrénées-Atlantiques
1972 births
Living people